PDGFRA, i.e. platelet-derived growth factor receptor A, also termed PDGFRα, i.e. platelet-derived growth factor receptor α, or CD140a i.e. Cluster of Differentiation 140a, is a receptor located on the surface of a wide range of cell types. This receptor binds to certain isoforms of platelet-derived growth factors (PDGFs) and thereby becomes active in stimulating cell signaling pathways that elicit responses such as cellular growth and differentiation. The receptor is critical for the development of certain tissues and organs during embryogenesis and for the maintenance of these tissues and organs, particularly hematologic tissues, throughout life. Mutations in the gene which codes for PDGFRA, i.e. the PDGFRA gene, are associated with an array of clinically significant neoplasms, notably ones of the clonal hypereosinophilia class of malignancies, as well as gastrointestinal stromal tumors (GISTs).

Overall structure 

This gene encodes a typical receptor tyrosine kinase, which is a transmembrane protein consisting of an extracellular ligand binding domain, a transmembrane domain and an intracellular tyrosine kinase domain.  The molecular mass of the mature, glycosylated PDGFRα protein is approximately 170 kDA. cell surface tyrosine kinase receptor for members of the platelet-derived growth factor family.

Modes of activation 

Activation of PDGFRα requires de-repression of the receptor's kinase activity.  The ligand for PDGFRα (PDGF) accomplishes this in the course of assembling a PDGFRα dimer.  Four of the five PDGF isoforms activate PDGFRα (PDGF-A, PDGF-B, PDGF-AB and PDGF-C).  The activated receptor phosphorylates itself and other proteins, and thereby engages intracellular signaling pathways that trigger cellular responses such as migration and proliferation.

There are also PDGF-independent modes of de-repressing the PDGFRα's kinase activity and hence activating it.  For instance, forcing PDGFRα into close proximity of each other by overexpression or with antibodies directed against the extracellular domain.  Alternatively, mutations in the kinase domain that stabilize a kinase active conformation result in constitutive activation. Finally, growth factors outside of the PDGFR family (non-PDGFs) activate PDGFRα indirectly. Non-PDGFs bind to their own receptors that trigger intracellular events that de-repress the kinase activity of PDGFRα monomers.  The intracellular events by which non-PDGFs indirectly activate PDGFRα include elevation of reactive oxygen species that activate Src family kinases, which phosphorylate PDGFRα.

The mode of activation determines the duration that PDGFRα remains active.  The PDGF-mediated mode, which dimerized PDGFRα, accelerates internalization and degradation of activated PDGFRα such that the half-life of PDGF-activated PDGFRα is approximately 5 min. Enduring activation of PDGFRα (half-life greater than 120 min) occurs when PDGFRα monomers are activated.

Role in physiology/pathology 
The importance of PDGFRA during development is apparent from the observation that the majority of mice lacking a functional Pdgfra gene develop a plethora of embryonic defects, some of which are lethal; the mutant mice exhibit defects in kidney glomeruli because of a lack of mesangial cells but also suffer an ill-defined blood defect characterized by thrombocytopenic, a bleeding tendency, and severe anemia which could be due to blood loss. The mice die at or shortly before birth. PDGF-A and PDGF-C seem to be the important activators of PDGFRα during development because mice lacking functional genes for both these PDGFRA activating ligands, i.e. Pdgfa/Pdgfc- double null mice show similar defects to Pdgra null mice. Mice genetically engineered to express a constitutively (i.e. continuously) activated PDGFRα mutant receptor eventually develop fibrosis in the skin and multiple internal organs. The studies suggest that PDGFRA plays fundamental roles in the development and function of mesodermal tissues, e.g., blood cells, connective tissue, and mesangial cells.

Clinical significance

PDGFRA mutations

Myeloid and lymphoid cells 
Somatic mutations that cause the fusion of the PDGFRA gene with certain other genes occur in hematopoietic stem cells and cause a hematological malignancy in the clonal hypereosinophilia class of malignancies. These mutations create fused genes which encode chimeric proteins that possess continuously active PDGFRA-derived tyrosine kinase. They thereby continuously stimulate cell growth and proliferation and lead to the development of leukemias, lymphomas, and myelodysplastic syndromes that are commonly associated with hypereosinophilia and therefore regarded as a sub-type of clonal eosinophilia. In the most common of these mutations, the PDGFRA gene on human chromosome 4 at position q12 (notated as 4q12) fuses with the FIP1L1 gene also located at position 4q12. This interstitial (i.e. on the same chromosome) fusion creates a FIP1L1-PDGFRA fusion gene while usually losing intervening genetic material, typically including either the CHIC2 or LNX gene. The fused gene encodes a FIP1L1-PDGFRA protein that causes: a) chronic eosinophilia which progresses to chronic eosinophilic leukemia; b) a form of myeloproliferative neoplasm/myeloblastic leukemia associated with little or no eosinophilia; c) T-lymphoblastic leukemia/lymphoma associated with eosinophilia; d) myeloid sarcoma with eosinophilia (see FIP1L1-PDGFRA fusion genes); or e) mixtures of these presentations. Variations in the type of malignancy formed likely reflects the specific type(s) of hematopoietic stem cells that bear the mutation. The PDGFRA gene may also mutate through any one of several chromosome translocations to create fusion genes which, like the Fip1l1-PDGFRA fusion gene, encode a fusion protein that possesses continuously active PDGFRA-related tyrosine kinase and causes myeloid and/or lymphoid malignancies. These mutations, including the Fip1l1-PDGFRA mutation, along with the chromosomal location of PDGFRAs partner and the notation used to identify the fused gene are given in the following table.

Patients afflicted with any one of these translocation mutations, similar to those afflicted with the interstitial PDGFRA-FIP1l1 fusion gene: a) present with findings of chronic eosinophilia, hypereosinophilia, the hypereosinophilic syndrome, or chronic eosinophilic leukemia; myeloproliferative neoplasm/myeloblastic leukemia; a T-lymphoblastic leukemia/lymphoma; or myeloid sarcoma; b) are diagnosed cytogenetically, usually by analyses that detect breakpoints in the short arm of chromosome 4 using Fluorescence in situ hybridization; and c)''' where treated (many of the translocations are extremely rare and have not be fully tested for drug sensitivity), respond well or are anticipated to respond well to imatinib therapy as described for the treatment of diseases caused by FIP1L1-PDGFRA fusion genes.

 Gastrointestinal tract 
Activating mutations in PDGFRA are also involved in the development of 2–15%  of gastrointestinal stromal tumors (GISTs), which is the most common mesenchymal neoplasm of the gastrointestinal tract. GIST tumors are sarcomas derived from the GI tract's connective tissue whereas most GI tract tumors are adenocarcinomas derived from the tract's epithelium cells. GIST tumors occur throughout the GI tract but most (66%) occur in the stomach and when developing there have a lower malignant potential than GIST tumors found elsewhere in the GI tract. The most common PDGFRA mutations found in GIST tumors occur in exon 18 and are thought to stabilize PDGFRA's tyrosine kinase in an activated conformation.  A single mutation, D842V, in this exon accounts for >70% of GIST tumors. The next most common GIST tumor mutation occurs in exon 18, accounts for <1% of GISTs tumors, and is a deletion of codons 842 to 845. Exon 12 is the second most commonly mutated PDGFRA exon in GIST, being found in ~1% of GIST tumors. Mutations in PDGFRA's exon 14 are found in <1% of GIST tumors. While some PDGFRA mutation-induced GIST tumors are sensitive to the tyrosine kinase inhibitor, imatinib, the most common mutation, D842V, as well as some very rare mutations are resistant to this drug: median overall survival is reported to be only 12.8 months in patients whose tumors bear the D842V mutation compared to 48–60 months in large series of imatinib-treated patients with other types of GIST mutations. Consequently, it is critical to define the exact nature of PDGFR-induced mutant  GIST tumors in order to select appropriate therapy particularly because a novel PDGFRA selective kinase inhibitor, crenolanib, is under investigation for treating D842V-induced and other imatinib-resistant GIST tumors. A randomized trial testing the efficacy of crenolanib in patients with GIST tumors bearing the D842V mutation is under recruitment.

Olaratumab (LY3012207) is a human IgG1 monoclonal antibody designed to bind to human PDGFRα with high affinity and block PDGF-AA, PDGF-BB, and PDGF-CC ligands from binding to the receptor. Numerous studies using it to treat soft tissue sarcomas including GIST are ongoing. Studies on GIST have focused on inoperable, metastatic, and/or recurrent disease and have tested olagatumab with Doxorubicin versus doxorubicin along. The US FDA granted approval for the use of olaratumab-dcoxorbicin therapy of soft tissue sarcomas under its Accelerated Approval Program based on the results of the phase II trial, (NCT01185964). In addition, the European Medicines Agency granted conditional approval for olaratumab in this indication in November 2016 following a review under the EMA's Accelerated Assessment Program.

 Nervous system 
Gain-of-function H3K27M mutations in protein histone H3 lead to inactivation of polycomb repressive complex 2 (PRC2) methyltransferase and result in global hypomethylation of H3K27me3 and transcriptional derepression of potential oncogenes. About 40% of these mutation are associated with gain of function or amplifications mutations in the PDGFRA gene in cases of pediatric diffuse Gliomas of the pons. It appears that the initial histone H3 mutations alone are insufficient but rather require cooperating secondary mutations such as PDGFRA-activating mutations or PDGFRA'' amplifications to develop this type of brain tumor. In a small non-randomized trial study, imatinib therapy in patients with glioblastoma selected on the basis of having imatinib-inhibitable tyrosine kinases in biopsy tissue caused marginal disease improvement compared to similar treatment of patients with unselected recurrent glioblastoma. This suggests that patient sub-populations with excessive PDGFRA-related or other tyrosine kinase-related over-activity might benefit from imatinib therapy. Several phase I and Phase II clinical glioma/glioblastoma studies have been conducted using imatinib but no decisive follow-up phase III studies have been reported.

Interactions 

PDGFRA has been shown to interact with:

 CRK, 
 Caveolin 1, 
 Cbl gene, 
 PDGFC,
 PDGFR-β, 
 PLCG1,  and
 Sodium-hydrogen antiporter 3 regulator 1.

Notes

See also 
 Platelet-derived growth factor receptor
 Clonal eosinophilia

References

Further reading

Tyrosine kinase receptors